Gabriel Johan Gudmundsson (born 29 April 1999) is a Swedish professional footballer who plays as a left-back for Ligue 1 club Lille and the Sweden national team.

Club career
On 31 August 2021, Gudmundsson signed a five-year contract with French champions Lille.

International career 
After having represented the Sweden U17, U19, and U21 teams a total of 11 times between 2014 and 2019, Gudmundsson made his full international debut for Sweden on 9 June 2022 in a 2022–23 UEFA Nations League B game against Serbia, replacing Viktor Claesson in the 77th minute of a 0–1 loss.

Personal life
Gabriel is the son of former Sweden and Blackburn Rovers player Niklas Gudmundsson.

Career statistics

Club

International 
'''

References

External links 
 
 

Living people
1999 births
Footballers from Malmö
Swedish footballers
Association football midfielders
Sweden youth international footballers
Sweden under-21 international footballers
Allsvenskan players
Halmstads BK players
FC Groningen players
Lille OSC players
Superettan players
Eredivisie players
Ligue 1 players
Swedish expatriate footballers
Expatriate footballers in the Netherlands
Swedish expatriate sportspeople in the Netherlands
Expatriate footballers in France
Swedish expatriate sportspeople in France